CaseComplete is a requirements management application from Serlio Software that allows business analysts and software developers to create and manage Use Cases and Software Requirements.  CaseComplete provides the ability to edit the textual portion of use cases and requirements in a guided environment and the ability to create various types of diagrams including use case diagrams, wireframes of graphical user interfaces, and flowcharts.

Output
CaseComplete comes packaged with built-in reports allowing users to publish their requirements in Microsoft Word, Microsoft Excel and HTML formats.  Users may create their own custom reports in addition to the built-in reports.

In 2012, Serlio Software released Requirements.cc, a web application that allows CaseComplete users to publish their requirements to the cloud.

CaseComplete also exports XML and XMI files.

See also
List of UML tools
Requirements analysis
Requirements management

References

External links
 CaseComplete official website
 Requirements.cc official website

UML tools
Technical communication tools
Business software for Windows